John Russell Owen (1881–1924) was a Scottish footballer who played in the Football League for Barnsley and Bolton Wanderers.

References

1881 births
1924 deaths
Scottish footballers
English Football League players
Association football forwards
Hibernian F.C. players
Aberdeen F.C. players
Barnsley F.C. players
Greenock Morton F.C. players
Bolton Wanderers F.C. players
Chorley F.C. players